The Hazelwood Tree is a giant sequoia in the Giant Forest, the sequoia grove where the largest living tree in the world, named General Sherman, grows. It is located on a hillside just west of the Hazelwood Nature Trail. The tree was measured in 1989.

See also
 List of largest giant sequoias
 List of individual trees

References

Individual giant sequoia trees
Sequoia National Park